Thayige Thakka Maga (Like Mother Like Son) is a 2018 Indian Kannada-language action drama film written, directed and produced by Shashank. It stars Krishna Ajai Rao, Ashika Ranganath and Sumalatha. The film marks 25th acting assignment for Ajai Rao and the first production venture for Shashank. Ajai plays the role of a karate trainer who fights against social injustice. Although the film borrows the title from the 1978 hit of the same name, the film reportedly does not relate to the earlier film.

The film released across Karnataka on 16 November 2018.

Plot 
Mohan Das (Ajai Rao), a karate trainer, decides to fight and wipe out crime. His mother, Parvathi (Sumalatha), a lawyer, motivates his fight against injustice. He falls in love with Saraswathi (Ashika Ranganath), his mother accepts her as she is the perfect match for him.

A corrupt minister, Prathap Kaale (Krishna Hebbal), supports his son Suraj Kaale (Sourav Lokesh) in all his crimes. Mohandas opposes him and decides to teach a lesson to him. Once Mohan Das beats and insults Suraj. Suraj attacks his mother, but Mohan protects his mother. He and his mother fight him in court, but lose for lack of evidence. Suraj stabs him outside, but Mohan Das wants to see the people's response. In the end, Mohan Das motivates the people, and the people kill Suraj and his father.

Cast 
 Krishna Ajai Rao as Mohan Das, Karate trainer, and son of Parvathi
 Ashika Ranganath as Saraswati, Mohan Das' love interest 
 Sumalatha as Parvathi, a lawyer, and mother of Mohan Das
 Achyuth Kumar
 Sadhu Kokila as Trainer of a Camp
 Saurav Lokesh as Suraj Kaale, Son of Corrupt Minister
 Krishna Hebbale as Prathap Kaale a Corrupt Minister

Soundtrack

Judah Sandhy has scored the soundtrack and score for the film. A total of six songs and one theme track were composed by him and written by Jayanth Kaikini, Raghavendra C. S. and the director Shashank.

References

External links 
  Thayige Thakka Maga (2018)

2010s Kannada-language films
2018 action drama films
2018 films
2018 martial arts films
Films directed by Shashank
Films shot in Karnataka
Indian action drama films
Indian martial arts films
Karate films